Oden Bowie (November 10, 1826December 4, 1894), a member of the United States Democratic Party, was the 34th Governor of the State of Maryland in the United States from 1869 to 1872.

Childhood
He was born in 1826 at Fairview Plantation in Collington, Maryland, the oldest son of Colonel William Duckett Bowie and Eliza Mary Oden.

He spent the bulk of his childhood at Fairview where he was educated by a private tutor until his mother died when he was nine years old. After his mother's death, he was sent to the preparatory department of St. John's College in Annapolis, Maryland where he studied for three years. At age twelve, he enrolled in St. Mary's Seminary and University and graduated in July 1845 as valedictorian of his class.

Career

Military 
In 1846 Bowie enlisted in the U.S. Army as a private at the outbreak of the Mexican–American War. He was promoted through the ranks, cited with "conspicuous bravery at Monterey" by Captain Taylor and eventually promoted to the rank of Captain by President James K. Polk, serving in the Voltigeur Regiment.  At the time he was the youngest Captain in the army.

Politics
In 1849, he was elected to his first political office, as a member of the Maryland House of Delegates, followed by the Maryland Senate from 1867 to 1869. On November 5, 1867, he became
the first Governor of Maryland to be elected under the post-Civil War Maryland Constitution of 1867, and as such, he did not assume the office of Governor until January 13, 1869. Bowie's term of Governor ended on January 10, 1872 ending his career in politics.

Railroading
Walter Bowie was a major advocate of expanding the railroad system into southern Maryland, and wrote articles lobbying for this under the pen name "Patuxent Planter". After significant lobbying together with Thomas Fielder Bowie, William Duckett Bowie, and Oden Bowie, the Baltimore and Potomac Railroad Company was organized. Two of the charter members were Walter Bowie and Thomas F Bowie. Directors included William Duckett Bowie and Oden. Oden became the first president of the Baltimore and Potomac Railroad around 1853 and also president of the
Baltimore City Passenger Railway in 1873.

Thoroughbred racing
Oden Bowie was an avid horseman who served for nineteen years as President of the Pimlico Jockey Club, and as President of the Maryland Jockey Club. At Fairview Plantation he bred Thoroughbred racehorses. Among his successful runners, Crickmore was voted the retrospective American Champion Two-Year-Old Colt of 1880.

In 1868, at a dinner party in Saratoga Springs, New York, Bowie and associates agreed to hold a horse race in 1870 for the yearlings owned by attendees at the party. A wager was placed and the winner of the race would host the losers for dinner. Both Saratoga and the American Jockey Club made bids for the event, but Bowie pledged to build a grand racetrack in his home state if the race were to be run in Baltimore. The Dixie Stakes, (also known as the Dinner Party Stakes) and Pimlico Race Course were the results.

Slavery
Before the Civil War, Fairview had many slaves. Charles Branch Clark wrote in 1946 in the Maryland Historical Magazine that seventy of Oden Bowie's slaves enlisted in the Union Army.

Family and private life
Bowie spent most of his life at Fairview Plantation. He married Alice Carter on December 3, 1851. She was the daughter of Charles H. Carter and Rosalie Eugenia Calvert Carter of Goodwood, Prince George's County. Alice's mother was a descendant of George Calvert, 1st Baron Baltimore the first colonial proprietor of the Province of Maryland.

Death
Bowie died after a brief illness on December 4, 1894 and was buried at Fairview.

Legacy
The city of Bowie, Maryland was founded as Huntington in 1870 at a junction of the Baltimore and Potomac Railroad. The town was renamed Bowie in the 1880s after Governor Oden Bowie.
Odenton, Maryland began as a junction of the Baltimore and Potomac Railroad and the Annapolis and Elk Ridge Railroad, named after Oden Bowie in 1872.
A 1,800-home subdivision, Fairwood, was built on the land of Oden Bowie's thousand acre plantation, Fairview, in Prince George's County, Maryland. The Fairwood community, which was approximately 73 percent African American in 2015, was heavily impacted by the Subprime mortgage crisis of 2007–2008, despite its affluence. Bowie descendants lived in the large Federal-style plantation house until 2015.

References

Further reading

Bowie family
Democratic Party governors of Maryland
Democratic Party Maryland state senators
People from Bowie, Maryland
St. John's College (Annapolis/Santa Fe) alumni
American racehorse owners and breeders
1826 births
1894 deaths
Democratic Party members of the Maryland House of Delegates
American military personnel of the Mexican–American War
19th-century American politicians